Gao Song (born April 16, 1992) is a basketball player for China women's national basketball team. She was part of the squad for the 2012 Summer Olympics.

References

1992 births
Living people
Chinese women's basketball players
Basketball players at the 2012 Summer Olympics
Basketball players at the 2016 Summer Olympics
Olympic basketball players of China
Basketball players from Heilongjiang
People from Daqing
Asian Games medalists in basketball
Basketball players at the 2010 Asian Games
Power forwards (basketball)
Asian Games gold medalists for China
Medalists at the 2010 Asian Games
Beijing Great Wall players
Heilongjiang Dragons players